Air Chief Marshal Hrushikesh Moolgavkar, PVSM, MVC (15 August 1920 – 9 April 2015) was a former Air officer in the Indian Air Force. He served as the 9th Chief of the Air Staff of the Indian Air Force from 1 February 1976 till 31 August 1978.

Early life and education
Moolgavkar was born on 14 August 1920 in Bombay. He attended the St. Mary's School, Mumbai and the St. Xavier's College, Mumbai. Moving to the United Kingdom for higher education, he attended the Malvern College. He was studying there when World War II broke out.

Military career

Early career
Moolgavkar was commissioned into the Indian Air Force as an acting Pilot Officer on 30 November 1940. He joined the No. 1 Squadron IAF, commanded by Squadron Leader Karun Krishna Majumdar, at Peshawar. He flew the Hawker Hart and the Westland Lysander aircraft. In early 1942, the squadron moved to Burma where he saw active service. In May 1942, he was promoted to the rank of Flying Officer. After the operations in Burma, he came back with the squadron to Secunderabad where Squadron Leader Subroto Mukerjee took command. The squadron then moved to Trichy and to RAF Station Kohat.

On 1 April 1944, Moolgavkar was promoted to the acting rank of Flight Lieutenant and transferred to No. 4 Squadron IAF, commanded by Squadron Leader Geoffrey Sharp of the Royal Air Force, at Chittagong. He flew the Supermarine Spitfire in escort fighter role in supply dropping missions. In January 1945, while on a sortie, the engine of his Spitfire failed. He crash landed on a beach and was stuck upside-down. Luckily, a couple of British Commandos spotted the plane and rescued him. He had multiple crushed vertebrae which required surgery and he spent about six months with his back in plaster. He got back to flying soon, joining the No. 10 Squadron IAF.

In January 1947, Moolgavkar was promoted to the acting rank of Squadron Leader and took command of No. 6 Squadron IAF at Kohat. After a short stint, he took command of No. 10 Squadron at Kanpur. The squadron was equipped with the Hawker Tempest II.

Post-Independence
During the partition of India, he was commanding the squadron at Kanpur. he was in command till February 1948. In April, he attended the first course at the Defence Services Staff College in Wellington. The college had relocated from Quetta after the partition of India. After completing the staff course, he took command of No. 1 Operational Wing at Srinagar from  Wing Commander Minoo Merwan Engineer.

Maha Vir Chakra
The No. 1 Operational Wing was in the thick of battle during the Indo-Pakistani War of 1947. Moolgavkar led the planning and execution of close air support during Operation Bison in Zoji La. He also flew sorties himself. For his exceptional gallantry and leadership, Moolgavkar was decorated with the Maha Vir Chakra (MVC), the second highest military decoration in India. He was among four IAF officers who were awarded the MVC during the war, the other three being Air Commodore Mehar Singh and Wing Commanders Minoo Merwan Engineer and Sidney Basil Noronha.
The citation for the Maha Vir Chakra reads as follows:

Post-war career
After the war, in March 1950, he commanded a detachment of de Havilland Vampire aircraft, which were recently received by the IAF. He led the detachment touring South India and in flying demonstrations in Bombay, Poona, Bangalore and Madras. In October 1950, he moved to Air headquarters as Deputy Director Operations. He was promoted to the acting rank of Group Captain and appointed Director of Operations at Air HQ in May 1952. He became the first IAF officer to serve in this appointment, since the previous officers were from the RAF. After a two-year stint at Air HQ, he took command of Palam Air Force Station from Group Captain H N Chatterjee.

In October 1954, he was a part of a team of three, consisting of Air Commodore (later Air Chief Marshal) Pratap Chandra Lal and Flight Lieutenant (later Air Commodore) Roshan Lal Suri, which went to Europe to select new aircraft for the IAF. The team rejected the Supermarine Swift, and chose the Folland Gnat, a decision which would hold India and the IAF in good stead during the Indo-Pakistani War of 1965. During this tour, he became among the first Indians to break the sound barrier. He was promoted substantive Group Captain on 1 April 1955. The 3 Wing at Palam had No. 7 Squadron and No. 10 Squadron under it, which were equipped with the Vampires. After a four-year stint at Palam, he served in a staff appointment at the Operational Command (later Western Air Command). In early 1959, Moolgavkar was appointed Air advisor to the High Commissioner of India to the United Kingdom was Vijaya Lakshmi Pandit at India House, London.

Air rank

Moolgavkar was promoted to the acting rank of Air Commodore and returned to India. He subsequently took over as the Senior Air Staff Officer (SASO) of the Operational Command. In October 1962, the Hawker Siddeley HS 748 arrived in India for a tour of demonstration flights. Moolgavkar led the team for this tour. He moved to Air HQ in June 1963, where he served as the Air Officer-in-Charge Policy and Plans.  He was promoted substantive Air Commodore on 1 April 1964. He served in this appointment for a year-and-a-half before moving to the Maintenance Command at Nagpur. He served as the Senior Air & Administration Staff Officer (SAASO) of the Command. Promoted to the acting rank of Air Vice Marshal on 25 January 1967, he took command of the newly created HQ Western India at Pune. He was made substantive Air Vice Marshal on 1 April 1968 and appointed Air Officer Commanding-in-Chief (AOC-in-C) Central Air Command at Allahabad. He was at the helm of the Central Air Command for three years, till March 1971.

On 1 April 1971, he was promoted to the acting rank of Air Marshal and appointed Commandant of the National Defence College in New Delhi. He assumed the office from Vice Admiral Sourendra Nath Kohli who was appointed the Flag Officer Commanding-in-Chief (FOC-in-C) Western Naval Command. He was promoted substantive Air Marshal in June 1972.

After a two-year stint at the helm of the NDC, in 1973, he took command of the Western Air Command, the biggest command in terms of resource, as its AOC-in-C. In March 1975, Moolgavkar personally participated in the Western Air Command Inter-Squadron Gunnery Meet. He won the Staff Pilots Championship Trophy for firing rockets from a single-seater Hunter aircraft. As the Commander-in-chief of the command, and at the age of 55, he was the envy of many younger pilots. In April, he took over as the Commodore Commandant of the squadron that he had commanded in the past - No. 10 Squadron.

Chief of Air Staff
In January 1976, the Government of India appointed Moolgavkar to be the next Chief of the Air Staff (CAS), succeeding Air Chief Marshal Om Prakash Mehra. He was promoted to the rank of Air Chief Marshal took over as the 9th CAS on 31 January. Soon after taking over as Chief, Moolgavkar and the Chief of the Naval Staff Admiral Jal Cursetji discussed about the handing over of the maritime reconnaissance role from the Indian Air Force to the Indian Navy. In accordance with this, the Lockheed L-1049 Super Constellation aircraft of the No. 6 Squadron IAF were transferred to the Navy. On 8 October 1976, the INAS 312 was commissioned at Goa.

Dates of rank

Personal life and death
The Moolgavkars had two children - a son Dr. Prakash and a daughter Jyoti. Jyoti later wrote the biography of the former CAS titled Leading from the Cockpit: A Fighter Pilot’s Story. The book was published and released in 2010.

See also
 National Defence College
 Commandant of the National Defence College

References

Bibliography

1920 births
2015 deaths
Chiefs of Air Staff (India)
Indian Air Force air marshals
Commandants of National Defence College, India
Indian Air Force
Indian Air Force officers
Recipients of the Param Vishisht Seva Medal
Recipients of the Maha Vir Chakra
Defence Services Staff College alumni